"The Fisherman and His Wife" (Low German: Von dem Fischer un syner Fru) is a German fairy tale collected by the Brothers Grimm in 1812 (KHM 19). The tale is of Aarne–Thompson type 555, about dissatisfaction and greed. It may be classified as an anti-fairy tale.

Origin 
The tale was published by the Brothers Grimm in the first edition of Kinder- und Hausmärchen in 1812 as tale no. 19. Their source was the German painter Philipp Otto Runge (1777–1810), from whom the Grimms obtained a manuscript of the tale in 1809. Johann Gustav Büsching published another version of Runge's manuscript a few months earlier in 1812 in Volkssagen, Märchen und Legenden, with some discrepancies with Grimm's version.

Synopsis

There is a poor fisherman who lives with his wife in a hovel by the sea. One day the fisherman catches a fish, who claims to be able to grant wishes and begs to be set free. The fisherman kindly releases it. When his wife hears the story, she says he ought to have had the fish grant him a wish. She insists that he go back and ask the flounder to grant her wish for a nice house.

The fisherman reluctantly returns to the shore but is uneasy when he finds that the sea seems to become turbid, as it was so clear before. He makes up a rhyme to summon the flounder, and it grants the wife's wish. The fisherman is pleased with his new wealth, but the wife is not and demands more, and demands that her husband go back and wish that he be made a king. Reluctantly, he does and gets his wish. But again and again, his wife sends him back to ask for more and more. The fisherman knows this is wrong but there is no reasoning with his wife. He says they should not annoy the flounder, and be content with what they have been given, but his wife is not content. Each time, the flounder grants the wishes with the words: "just go home again, she has it already" or similar, but each time the sea grows rougher and rougher.

Eventually, the wife wishes to command the sun, moon, and heavens, and she sends her husband to the flounder with the wish "I want to become equal to God". Instead of granting this, the flounder just tells the fisherman to go home, stating that "she is sitting in her old hovel again". And with that, the sea becomes calm once more, and the fisherman and his wife are once more living in nothing but their old, dirty hovel.

Variants 
The "Fisherman and His Wife" is similar to other AT-555 tales such as the German "Hanns Dudeldee", the Russian "The Old Man, His Wife, and the Fish", the Japanese "The Stonecutter", and the Indian "The Bullock's Balls".

French author Edouard Laboulaye published a literary reworking of an Estonian tale titled The Fairy Crawfish. In this tale, poor fisherman Loppi finds a magical crawfish that can grant all his wishes. Loppi is satisfied with very little, but his nagging wife Masica is always asking more and more things from the crawfish.

Cultural legacy 
Its theme was used in The Tale of the Fisherman and the Fish, an 1833 poem by Aleksandr Pushkin. Virginia Woolf has her character Mrs. Ramsey in To the Lighthouse read a version of the story to her son, James. Günter Grass's 1977 novel, The Flounder, is loosely based on the fairy tale, as are Emanuele Luzzati's version, Punch and the Magic Fish, and Ursula LeGuin's novel The Lathe of Heaven.

A short cartoon based on this story was part of the American animated television series, The Rocky and Bullwinkle Show. The Flounder was replaced by a beautiful mermaid who grants the wishes in exchange for her freedom. Additionally, the wife goes directly from queen to wishing to be a 'goddess'. The mermaid points out to the fisherman that all his wishes have been for his wife, and asks him what he desires. The fisherman replies that he just wants his wife to be happy, and the mermaid replies, "Go; she is happy." As in the later 1997 version, the fisherman and his wife are reduced to living in their hovel, but the wife is happy that it is poor yet neat.

In 1997, the story was given a Spanish-flavored adaptation on the animated TV series, Happily Ever After: Fairy Tales for Every Child. Edward James Olmos and Julia Migenes provided the voices of the fisherman and his wife. In this version, the fisherman is unable to figure out what his last wish is, and says, "I want only for my wife to be happy". Immediately, he and his wife are reduced to living in the hovel again. She is content and happily embraces him.

An episode of the Disney TV cartoon Timon and Pumbaa titled "Be More Pacific" is based on this story, with Pumbaa's role paralleling the fisherman's and Timon's role paralleling the wife's. Pumbaa finds and rescues a magical whale named Lester, who grants him three wishes. Pumbaa asks for nothing for himself, but he does relay Timon's wishes to Lester.  First Timon wishes for "something big and expensive" and is given the Statue of Liberty. Then he wishes to be a king and is transformed into a giant. Lastly he wishes to be "a regular-sized king in a stone castle with a ferocious fire-breathing monster that he can defeat," but Pumbaa gets the message wrong and says "can't" instead of "can." The ferocious monster turns out to be a fire-breathing chicken (instead of the dragon that Timon actually meant), and after several futile attempts to defeat and escape it, the episode ends with Timon searching for another wish-granting fish while Pumbaa struggles to hold down the trapdoor separating them from the monster.

See also

The Gold-Children

References

External links

 

ATU 500-559
Fictional fish
Fictional married couples
Fictional fishers
Grimms' Fairy Tales
Literary duos